Giorgos Loizou (born 29 May 1990) is a Cypriot footballer who played for Olympiakos Nicosia as a striker.

Career

Early career
Loizou, born in Nicosia, begun his football career from Adonis Idaliou and then he had brief spell from two Paphos clubs, APOP Kinyras Peyias and Kedros Agias Marinas. In 2012-13 season, he was member of Cypriot Second Division club Onisilos Sotira where he was so unlucky, since he sustained cruciate ligament rupture.

Othellos Athienou
Next season he moved on to Othellos Athienou where he gained the promotion to first division with club by finishing in the second place. For the season 2013-14 he scored 8 goals in eighteen matches, being the third goalscorer of the team, and contributed greatly to the progress of Othellos to reach for the first time in the history to the first division.

With Othellos playing for the first time ever in the first division, Loizou was the key player in the matches against the league leaders Apollon Limassol in second phase of 2014–15 Cypriot Cup as he scored two goals making the surprise to win and went through to the quarterfinals.

Olympiakos Nicosia
In July 2015, Loizou agreed to sign with Cypriot Second Division club Olympiakos Nicosia.

Career statistics

Club

References

External links
 

1990 births
Living people
Cypriot footballers
Association football forwards
Cypriot First Division players
APOP Kinyras FC players
Onisilos Sotira players
Othellos Athienou F.C. players
Olympiakos Nicosia players